Melaleuca cornucopiae is a shrub in the myrtle family Myrtaceae and is endemic to western Arnhem Land in the Northern Territory of Australia. It is distinguished by it unusual flowering spike - a horn-like structure covered by overlapping bracts with the flowers opening in succession, starting from the bottom of the spike.

Description

The flowers occur on a spike, usually at the end the branches which continue to grow after the flowering period. The flowers open in succession from the bottom end of the spike which contains 10 to 50 groups of flowers in threes.

Taxonomy and naming
Melaleuca cornucopiae was first formally described by Norman Byrnes in 1984 in Austrobaileya. The specific epithet (cornucopiae) refers to the horn-like appearance of the flower spike.

Distribution and habitat
This melaleuca occurs in western Arnhem Land in mixed woodland growing in sandy soils on sandstone.

References

cornucopiae
Myrtales of Australia
Flora of the Northern Territory
Plants described in 1984
Taxa named by Norman Brice Byrnes